C-122 may refer to one of the following aircraft
YC-122 Avitruc, a prototype transport aircraft developed for the USAF
Chadwick C-122, a helicopter